Contemporary Political Theory is a peer-reviewed academic journal covering political theory and philosophy published by Palgrave Macmillan. The editors-in-chief are Terrell Carver (University of Bristol) and Samuel A. Chambers (Johns Hopkins University).

External links

Political science journals
Publications established in 2002
English-language journals
Quarterly journals
Palgrave Macmillan academic journals